Grandidier is a surname. Notable people with the surname include:

Alfred Grandidier (1836–1921), French naturalist and explorer
Ernest Grandidier (1833–1912), French industrialist, naturalist, and art collector, brother of Alfred
Guillaume Grandidier, French geographer, ethnologist, and zoologist, son of Alfred